Manicavasagar Kanagasabapathy Eelaventhan (born M. K. Kanagentran, 14 September 1932) is a Sri Lankan Tamil politician and former Member of Parliament.

Early life and family
Kanagentran was born on 14 September 1932. He is the son of Kanagasabapathy, a station master from Nallur in northern Ceylon. He was educated at St. John's College, Jaffna and Wesley College, Colombo.

Career
Kanagentran worked at the Central Bank of Ceylon, eventually becoming head of the Tamil translation section in the Economic Research Department before retiring in 1980.

Kanagentran was an active member of the Illankai Tamil Arasu Kachchi (ITAK) but in 1970 joined V. Navaratnam's Tamil Self Rule Party. He later re-joined ITAK, which was now part of the Tamil United Liberation Front (TULF). Kanagentran was president of the TULF's Colombo branch. He was a victim of the 1977 riots. He became a high profile advocate of Tamil Eelam and changed his name to Eelaventhan which means "King of Eelam" in Tamil. In 1980 he and others left ITAK to form the Tamil Eelam Liberation Front (TELF). Eelaventhan was TELF's secretary.

With the escalation of violence Eelaventhan, like many Sri Lankan Tamil politician, moved to Tamil Nadu in 1981. He and four others were arrested in Madras in February 1997 on charges of procuring medicine for the Liberation Tigers of Tamil Eelam. All five were acquitted in August 1999. Eelaventhan was deported to Sri Lanka on 4 December 2000.

Eelaventhan was appointed as a Tamil National Alliance National List MP in the Sri Lankan Parliament following the 2004 parliamentary election. He forfeited his seat in Parliament in November 2007 for being absent for more than three months.

Eelaventhan emigrated to Canada where in May 2010 he was elected to the Transnational Constituent Assembly of Tamil Eelam.

References

External links
 

1932 births
Alumni of St. John's College, Jaffna
Alumni of Wesley College, Colombo
Canadian people of Sri Lankan Tamil descent
Illankai Tamil Arasu Kachchi politicians
Living people
Members of the 13th Parliament of Sri Lanka
Members of the Transnational Constituent Assembly of Tamil Eelam
People from Northern Province, Sri Lanka
People from British Ceylon
Sri Lankan Hindus
Sri Lankan Tamil politicians
Tamil National Alliance politicians
Tamil United Liberation Front politicians